Ananda Chandra College of Commerce, established in 1962, is one of the oldest college in Jalpaiguri. It offers both undergraduate and post graduate courses.  It is affiliated to  University of North Bengal.

Accreditation
The college is recognized by the University Grants Commission (UGC).

See also

References

External links
Ananda Chandra College of Commerce
University of North Bengal
University Grants Commission
National Assessment and Accreditation Council

Colleges affiliated to University of North Bengal
Educational institutions established in 1962
Universities and colleges in Jalpaiguri district
Commerce colleges in India
1962 establishments in West Bengal